Disinhibited Social Engagement Disorder (DSED), or Disinhibited Attachment Disorder, is an attachment disorder in which a child has little to no fear of unfamiliar adults and may actively approach them. It can significantly impair young children's abilities to relate with adults and peers, according to the Diagnostic and Statistical Manual of Mental Disorders. as well as put them in dangerous and potentially unsafe conditions. Common examples of this include sitting on a person's lap of which they do not know or leaving with a stranger.

DSED is exclusively a childhood disorder and is usually not diagnosed before the age of nine months or until after age five if symptoms do not appear. There is no current research showing that signs of DSED continue after twelve years of age. Infants and young children are at risk of developing DSED if they receive inconsistent or insufficient care from a primary caregiver.

Signs and symptoms
The most common symptom is unusual interaction with strangers. A child with DSED shows no sign of fear or discomfort when talking to, touching, or accompanying an adult stranger. They can be categorized by the following:

 Overly familiar verbal or physical behavior that is not consistent with culturally sanctioned and appropriate social boundaries or seems out of character for their current age
 Lack of reservation when it comes to approaching and interacting with unfamiliar adults
 Diminished or absent checking back with an adult caregiver after venturing away, even in unfamiliar settings
 Willingness to go off with an unfamiliar adult with minimal or no hesitation 

The attachment style associated with DSED is disorganized attachment. This attachment style is a combination of anxious and avoidant attachment and participants often have a need for closeness, fear of rejection, and contradictory mental states and behaviors. Disorganized Attachment is common amongst children living in institutions such as foster care. Children living in these institutions have an increased risk of having DSED. Which is common in those who experience neglect from caregivers at an early age making it a common occurrence in children with DSED.

DSED can cause symptoms commonly associated with attention deficit hyperactivity disorder (ADHD) It can be comorbid with cognitive, language and speech delay. Additionally, children who are socially disinhibited despite not undergoing the trauma to become so should not be diagnosed with DSED. The child's behavior can be explained with other disorders such as Williams syndrome which often has similar symptoms to DSED.

Risk factors
DSED is a result of inconsistent or absent primary caregivers in the first few years of childhood. Children who are institutionalized may receive inconsistent care or become isolated during hospitalization. Parental issues such as mental health problems, depression, personality disorder, absence, poverty, teen parenting, or substance abuse interfere with attachment.

Diagnosis 
The criteria for Disinhibited Social Engagement Disorder in the DSM-5 are:

A. A pattern of behavior in which a child actively approaches and interacts with unfamiliar adults and exhibits at least two of the following:

 Reduced or absent reticence in approaching and interacting with unfamiliar adults.
 Overly familiar verbal or physical behavior (that is not consistent with culturally sanctioned and with age-appropriate social boundaries).
 Diminished or absent checking back with an adult caregiver after venturing away, even in unfamiliar settings.
 Willingness to go off with an unfamiliar adult with little or no hesitation.

B. The behaviors in Criterion A are not limited to impulsivity (as in Attention-Deficit/Hyperactivity Disorder) but include socially disinhibited behavior.

C.  The child has experienced insufficient care as evidenced by at least one of the following:

 Social neglect or deprivation where the child's emotional needs are not met by care-giving adults.
 Repeated changes of primary caregivers that limit the ability to form stable attachments (e.g., frequent changes in foster care).
 Rearing in unusual settings that severely limit opportunities to form selective attachments (e.g., institutions with the high child to caregiver ratios).

D. The care in Criterion C is presumed to be responsible for the disturbed behavior in Criterion A (e.g., the disturbances in Criterion A began following the pathogenic care in Criterion C).

E. The child has a developmental age of at least nine months.

Specifiers

It is considered persistent if the duration is more than 12 months.

It is considered severe if all the symptoms are present.

The ICD-10 definition is: "A particular pattern of abnormal social functioning that arises during the first five years of life and that tends to persist despite marked changes in environmental circumstances, e.g. diffuse, nonselectively focused attachment behavior, attention-seeking and indiscriminately friendly behavior, poorly modulated peer interactions; depending on circumstances, there may also be associated emotional or behavioral disturbance."

Differential diagnosis can be attention deficit hyperactivity disorder.

Treatment
Two effective treatment approaches are play therapy or expressive therapy which help form attachment through multi-sensory means. Some therapy can be nonverbal.

Play Therapy: This is a therapy in which children use toys to “play” and interact with the environment in efforts to work through their problems and understand the world around them. In this therapy children can decide the outcome of situations giving them a sense of control. This is for children ages three to eleven and it can also be used as a means to diagnose a child. Also this type of therapy can be directed in attempts to better understand and diagnose the child. This is a psychodynamic and cognitive behavior therapy.

Prognosis 
Over time the nature of the behaviors of a child with disinhibited social engagement disorder can evolve during their preschool, middle school, and adolescence years. With this being said, most of the symptoms exhibited by children significantly lessen to the point of almost no detection after approximately twelve years of age.

Pre School: In this early stage DSED is exhibited by a need for attention such as being overly boisterous at the playground in attempts to get the attention of unfamiliar adults

Middle School: There are two main identifiers of DSED in this stage including physical and verbal overfamiliarity of inauthentic emotions and being overly forward. This can be seen as appearing sad in front of others in efforts to manipulate a social situation or being overly insistent upon going over a classmate's house when they first meet them.

Adolescent: Amongst this stage children with DSED are likely to develop problems amongst both their peers and other authoritative figures such as parents and coaches. With that being said “They [also] tend to develop superficial relationships with others, struggle with conflict, and continue to demonstrate indiscriminate behavior toward adults.”

Epidemiology
The exact prevalence is unknown. In high-risk individuals, the prevalence rate is 20%.

History
Disinhibited Social Engagement Disorder (DSM-5 313.89 (F94.2)) is the 2013 Diagnostic and Statistical Manual of Mental Disorders, Fifth Edition (DSM-5) name formerly listed as a sub-type of Reactive Attachment Disorder (RAD) called Disinhibited Attachment Disorder (DAD).

The American Psychiatric Association considers "...Disinhibited Social Engagement Disorder more closely resembles ADHD; it may occur in children who do not necessarily lack attachments and may have established or even secure attachments. The two disorders differ in other important ways, including correlates, course, and response to intervention, and for these reasons are considered separate disorders."

Research 

This study was an attempt to solidify the current research that Reactive Attachment Disorder and Disinhibited Social Engagement Disorder are separate dimensions of psychology. In this study a sample of school aged foster children were tested and their foster parents, and social workers completed questionnaires to better understand the children and to pinpoint signs of DSED. Amongst completion it was evident that DSED was indeed its own separate dimension of psychology.

See also 
Reactive attachment disorder
Attachment style

References 

Attachment theory
Human development
Mental disorders diagnosed in childhood
Adoption, fostering, orphan care and displacement
Stress-related disorders